Professor Richard Hill Norris FRSE FRSGS (1830-1916) was a British physiologist, spiritualist and photographer. From the 1880s he began microscopic photography of blood corpuscles and was a pioneer of microphotography. In 1856 he invented the dry collodion photographic plate.

Life
Norris studied medicine at the University of Edinburgh, developing an early interest in microphotography; mainly taking pictures of frogs' blood. In 1856 he invented the first dry collodion photographic plate, during 1858 founding the Patent Dry Collodion Plate Company in Birmingham - one of the first commercial producers of photographic materials in the world.

From 1862 to 1891 he was Professor of Physiology at Queens College in Birmingham.

In 1878 he was elected a Fellow of the Royal Society of Edinburgh, their proposers being Sir Thomas Richard Fraser, John Gray McKendrick, Alexander Dickson and Alexander Buchan. He was President of the Birmingham Philosophical Society.

Sometime within April 1882 he complained to The Lancet, stating Giulio Bizzozero had plagiarised pieces of his work.

He was still patenting photographic processes in 1888, By December 1890 having went into partnership with Harold William Southall of Edgbaston, founding the Birmingham Dry Collodion Plate and Film Company; In concurrence constructing a sizable factory within Yardley, Birmingham which initiated production in 1893. However, this company failed and was liquidated in 1895. 

Norris was also involved in microscopic studies of metals heating and cooling together with George Gore at the Institute of Scientific Research in Birmingham.

His personal interests extended deeply into spiritualism, considering himself an amateur medium - becoming involved in seances and automatic writing. He believed in allopsychism, mesmerism and hypnotism, Engaging in studies of Christine Beauchamp. He did not publish any of his thoughts on spiritualism however corresponded with several parties such as Alfred Russel Wallace, William Crookes, Emma Hardinge and Samuel Guppy.

Family

In 1852 he was married to Ann (1827-1901). Their son Richard Hill Norris (1853-1919) was also a doctor; Other sons included Arthur Kingsley Norris and Benjamin Stuart Norris. His brother was Joseph Norris, Victorian photographer.

Publications

On Stasis of Blood and Exudation (1862)
On the Laws and Principles Concerned in the Aggregation of Blood Corpuscles (1869)
On the Extrusion of the Morphological Elements of the Blood (1871)
On the Physical Principles Concerned in the Passage of Blood Corpuscles through the Walls of the Vessels (1871)
The Physiology and Pathology of the Blood (1882)

References

1830 births
1916 deaths
19th-century English photographers
Alumni of the University of Edinburgh
English inventors
English spiritualists
Fellows of the Royal Society of Edinburgh
Photographers from Birmingham, West Midlands
British physiologists